Oldways End is a hamlet in the civil parish of East Anstey in the North Devon district of Devon, England. The hamlet lies just off the Devon-Somerset border.

Hamlets in Devon